DnaE, the gene product of dnaE, is the catalytic α subunit of DNA polymerase III, acting as a DNA polymerase. This enzyme is only found in prokaryotes.

References 

Bacterial proteins
DNA replication